The Edward Rose House in Fayette, Alabama is a Queen Anne-style house which was built in 1898.  Located at 325 2nd Ave., Northwest, it has also been known as the Rose House Inn.  It was listed on the National Register of Historic Places in 1995.

It is a one-and-a-half-story house with a wraparound porch with lace-like brackets.  It has a hexagonal tower with a bell-shaped roof.

In a renovation of the house, the original 14-foot ceilings were restored by removal of a dropped ceiling.

References

National Register of Historic Places in Alabama
Queen Anne architecture in Alabama
Houses completed in 1898
Fayette County, Alabama